The Institute of Vertebrate Paleontology and Paleoanthropology (IVPP) of China is a research institution and collections repository for fossils, including many dinosaur and pterosaur specimens (many from the Yixian Formation).  As its name suggests, research is focused on both paleontological topics and those relating to human prehistory.

The institution, located in Beijing, grew out of the Cenozoic Research Laboratory in 1929 and is its own institution under the Chinese Academy of Sciences.  Its staff have increasingly worked internationally, participating in the China-Canada Dinosaur Project from 1986 to 1991 and authoring or coauthoring forty-five Nature and Science articles from 1999 to  2005. Notable paleontologists who have been affiliated with the IVPP include Yang Zhongjian (also known as C. C. Young), Dong Zhiming, Meemann Chang and Zhao Xijin.

See also 
 List of museums in China

References

External links
Official website

Research institutes of the Chinese Academy of Sciences
Natural history museums in China
Paleontological research institutes
Paleontology in China
Organizations based in Beijing